Latu (born 23 February 1993) is a Tongan-born Australian Rugby Union player who currently is a hooker for the New South Wales Waratahs in Super Rugby.

Career
Latu plays Shute Shield rugby for Sydney University and was a member of the premiership-winning side in 2013. His performances there caught the eye of the New South Wales Waratahs who signed him up ahead of the 2014 Super Rugby season.
Tolu Latu represented the Sydney East Primary Schools Sports Association at the State Championships in 2005.

International career
Latu was a member of the Australia Under 20 side that competed in the 2012 and 2013 IRB Junior World Championships.

Latu made his debut for Australia against Wales in 2016. and played at the 2019 Rugby World Cup, but the Wallabies lost to England in the quarter finals, thus knocking them out.

In 2021, Latu was called up to play in the 2021 end-of-year rugby tests, under a new Giteau's law tweak that allowed up to three players from overseas to appear. He was called up alongside former players Will Skelton, Kurtley Beale and Rory Arnold.

References

External links
 

1993 births
Living people
Australian rugby union players
Rugby union hookers
People from Nukuʻalofa
Tongan emigrants to Australia
New South Wales Waratahs players
Sydney Stars players
Australia international rugby union players
New South Wales Country Eagles players
Stade Français players